Catch may refer to:

In sports
 Catch (game), children's game
 Catch (baseball), a maneuver in baseball
 Catch (cricket), a mode of dismissal in cricket
 Catch or reception (gridiron football)
 Catch, part of a rowing stroke

In music
 Catch (music), a form of round
 Catch (band), an English band
 C. C. Catch (born 1964), Dutch-born German pop singer

Albums
 Catch, 1969 self titled album by Catch
 Catch (Misako Odani album), 2006
 Catch! (Tsuji Shion album)
 Catch, a 2002 electronic album by Kosheen

Songs
 "Catch" (The Cure song), 1987
 "Catch" (Kosheen song), 2000
 "Catch" (Allie X song)
 "Catch" (Brett Young song), 2019

Other uses
 Catch or latch, a device to close a door or window
 catch, a computer-language command in exception handling syntax
 Catch, an Indian web news magazine owned by Rajasthan Patrika
 Catch, a ship of the Third Supply fleet to Virginia colony in 1609

See also
 Caught (disambiguation)
 The Catch (disambiguation)
 Catch and release
 Catch-22 (disambiguation)
 Catching (disambiguation)